The Concertainer, known colloquially as the HESCO MIL, Hesco barrier, or Hesco bastion, is a modern gabion primarily used for flood control and military fortifications. It is made of a collapsible wire mesh container and heavy duty fabric liner, and used as a temporary to semi-permanent levee or blast wall against small-arms fire and/or explosives. It has seen considerable use during the wars in Iraq and Afghanistan.

Originally designed for use on beaches and marshes for erosion and flood control, the HESCO barrier quickly became a popular security device in the 1990s. HESCO barriers continue to be used for their original purpose. They were used in 2005 to reinforce levees around New Orleans in the weeks between Hurricane Katrina and Hurricane Rita. During the June 2008 Midwest floods  of HESCO barrier wall were shipped to Iowa. In late March 2009,  of HESCO barrier were delivered to Fargo, North Dakota to protect against floods.  In late September 2016,  of HESCO barriers were used in Cedar Rapids, Iowa, for the fall flood of 2016.

Development
The Concertainer was originally developed by Jimi Heselden, a British entrepreneur and ex-coal miner, who founded HESCO Bastion Ltd. in 1989 to manufacture his invention. The brand name for the barrier is a portmanteau of the words "concertina" and "container".

Assembly
Assembling the HESCO MIL units entails unfolding it and filling it with sand, soil or gravel, usually using a front end loader. The placement of the barrier is generally very similar to the placement of a sandbag barrier or earth berm except that room must generally be allowed for the equipment used to fill the barrier. The main advantage of HESCO barriers, strongly contributing to their popularity with troops and flood fighters, is the quick and easy setup. Previously, people had to fill sandbags, a slow undertaking, with one worker filling about 20 sandbags per hour. Workers using HESCO barriers and a front end loader can do ten times the work of those using sandbags.

The HESCO barriers come in a variety of sizes. Most of the barriers can also be stacked, and they are shipped collapsed in compact sets.

A new system of HESCO MIL Concertainer developed specially for military use is deployed from a container, which is dragged along the line of ground where the barrier is to be formed, unfolding up to several hundred metres of barrier ready for filling within minutes.

See also
 Bremer wall - steel-reinforced concrete blast walls

References

External links

 HESCO Bastion Ltd—HESCO company site

British inventions
Flood barriers
Fortification (architectural elements)
Gabions